Car Stereo Wars are a pop band formed in Melbourne, Australia in 2000.

History

Car Stereo Wars were formed in Melbourne in 2000 by Jason White and Matt Gillman after meeting at a computer animation course. They were joined soon after by Alyssa Doe on vocals and went on to release their first EP "Project A." The song "Broken" was then picked up for Ministry of Sounds Chillout Sessions and subsequently signed to Ministry of Sound Australia and released "They Asked me to be in a Movie" EP in 2003.  The single "Come to Nothing" was then added to the playlist of a subsequent Ministry of Sound chillout compilation.

The band released their debut album in 2008 "For Your Comfort and Safety" and has enjoyed recent commercial success with the track "Come to Nothing" being used in a Tic Tac television commercial in the United States and available as a free download from the Tic Tac USA website. The track has also been used in an advertisement for DELL Computers.

Live Shows
It is rare to see the band play live however they have made several trips to the United States for music festivals. In 2001 Car Stereo Wars travelled to Austin, Texas to play at the annual SXSW festival, then in 2003 traveled again to the U.S to play at legendary CBGB's in New York as part of the CMJ Music Marathon  The band has also played some shows in their hometown Melbourne, usually only to support an album or E.P launch.

Members

The current members are:

Alyssa Doe: 2002–present (vocals, keyboards, tuba)
Jason White: 2000–present (bass, guitar, and vocals)
Matt Gillman: 2000–present (guitar, bass, keyboards)
Sean Ashbrooke: 2003–present (guitar)
Graeme Luther: 2003–present (drums)
David Meagher 2007–2011 (guitar/keyboards)

Discography

Albums
For your Comfort and Safety (2008)

Compilations
Ministry of Sound - Chillout Sessions - Summer (2003)
Ministry of Sound - Chillout Sessions - Volume 5 (2004)
Brave New Day - Oxfam Tsunami Aid Compilation (2005)

EPs
Project A (2000)
They Asked Me to Be in a Movie (2003)

References

External links
 Official site
 Car Stereo Wars on MySpace

Musical collectives
Musical groups established in 2000
Musical groups from Melbourne
Australian pop music groups
Australian electronic music groups
Electronica music groups